Hürriyet Sırmaçek (1912 - 2 January 1983) was Turkey's first female bridge engineer.

Early life 
Hürriyet Sırmaçek was born in Damascus in 1912 when it was part of the Ottoman Empire. She graduated from Erenköy Girls High School in 1929, then attended Istanbul Technical University, graduating in 1935 with a specialisation in road and bridge engineering.

Career 
She worked as a senior engineer at various levels in the Turkish State Railways (TCDD). Roles included working as a control engineer for structural calculations, including concrete, at the Sivas Lokomotif and Wagon Factory. Other work included engineering the "T" deck beam supporting the Haydarpaşa overpass at the 71km mark on the Izmir-Manisa road. She calculated the requirements for the 2x45'lik steel truss bridge, the first such edifice in Turkey.

In 1964, Sırmaçek was appointed as a General Technical Consultant in the Directorate. She later served as Deputy General Director of the TCDD.

Between 1970 and 1971, she worked in the State Planning Organisation (DPT) on behalf of the Ministry of Transport, looking at transportation issues in preparation for the Southeast development plan.

Sırmaçek retired in 1971.

Memberships 
 Founder member of Türkiye Köprü ve İnşaat Cemiyeti - the Turkish Association for Bridge and Structural Engineering
 Türkiye Yüksek Mühendisler Birliği - Turkish Engineers Association - board member and General Secretary
 Soroptimist Clubs Association - chairman of Turkish branch
 Head of the Erenköy Girls' High School Alumni Association for 17 years 
 Member of the Board of Directors of the Istanbul Chamber of Engineers, including a period as president of the organisation.

Personal life 
Hürriyet Sırmaçek died on 2 January 1983.

References 

1983 deaths
1912 births
Turkish civil engineers
Istanbul Technical University alumni
Erenköy Girls High School alumni
Women engineers
20th-century women engineers